Two Royal Navy ships have been named HMS Anchusa after the flower:

 , an  launched in 1917.
 , a  launched at Harland and Wolff on 15 January 1941 and sold in 1946. The new owners renamed her Silverlord.

References
 

Royal Navy ship names